Oxymeris dillwynii is a species of sea snail, a marine gastropod mollusc in the family Terebridae, the auger snails.

Description
The shell size between 15 mm and 85 mm.

Distribution
This species occurs in the Atlantic Ocean off West Africa, the Gulf of Guinea, Senegal and Cape Verdes.

References

 Bratcher T. & Cernohorsky W.O. (1987). Living terebras of the world. A monograph of the recent Terebridae of the world. American Malacologists, Melbourne, Florida & Burlington, Massachusetts. 240pp
 Rolán E., 2005. Malacological Fauna From The Cape Verde Archipelago. Part 1, Polyplacophora and Gastropoda
 Terryn Y. (2007). Terebridae: A Collectors Guide. Conchbooks & NaturalArt. 59pp + plates

External links
 
 Deshayes, G. P. (1859). A general review of the genus Terebra, and a description of new species. Proceedings of the Zoological Society of London. (1859) 27: 270-321
 Deshayes, G. P. (1857). Description d'espèces nouvelles du genre Terebra. Journal de Conchyliologie. 6 (1): 65-102
 Fedosov, A. E.; Malcolm, G.; Terryn, Y.; Gorson, J.; Modica, M. V.; Holford, M.; Puillandre, N. (2020). Phylogenetic classification of the family Terebridae (Neogastropoda: Conoidea). Journal of Molluscan Studies. 85(4): 359-388

Terebridae
Gastropods described in 1859
Molluscs of the Atlantic Ocean
Gastropods of Cape Verde
Invertebrates of West Africa